Odd Wilhelm Surén (born 8 March 1961) is a Norwegian novelist, short story writer and non-fiction writer. He made his literary debut in 1985 with the short story collection Fanger og opprørere. Among his novels are Dråper i havet from 1998, and For hva det er verdt from 2010.

He was awarded Mads Wiel Nygaards Endowment in 2001.

A literary critic for the weekly newspaper Dag og Tid, he received the Norwegian Literature Critics Award for 2013.

References

1961 births
Living people
20th-century Norwegian novelists
21st-century Norwegian novelists
Norwegian non-fiction writers